"You Don't Know Me" (originally titled "U Don't Know Me") is a song by American record producer Armand van Helden featuring vocals from German-American singer Duane Harden. It was released on January 25, 1999, as the lead single from his third studio album, 2 Future 4 U. The creation of the song came about when Helden created a looping track composed of several music samples and left Harden to write and record the lyrics alone.

The song peaked at number two on the US Billboard Hot Dance Music/Club Play chart and reached number one on the UK Singles Chart in February 1999. "You Don't Know Me" additionally reached the top 10 in France, Greece, and Italy, and topped the Canadian RPM Dance chart.

Content
The strings featured in this song are courtesy of Carrie Lucas's "Dance with You", also used in Phats and Small's "Music for Pushchairs". The drums are sampled from Jaydee's "Plastic Dreams". The full version of the track features a dialogue from the Dial M for Monkey segment of Cartoon Network's Dexter's Laboratory. The episode was "Simion", where the title character (voiced by Maurice LaMarche) provided the spoken intro. It was also very heavily influenced by "The Captain" by Johnick which was released the year prior on the Henry Street record label.

Track listings

US maxi-CD single
 "U Don't Know Me" (original mix)
 "Alienz"
 "Rock da Spot" featuring Mr. Len
 "U Don't Know Me" (dubstrumental)
 "U Don't Know Me" (radio edit)

Canadian maxi-CD single
 "U Don't Know Me" (radio edit)
 "Alienz"
 "Rock da Spot" featuring Mr. Len
 "U Don't Know Me" (dubstrumental)
 "U Don't Know Me" (original mix)

US 12-inch single
A. "You Don't Know Me"
B. "You Don't Know Me" (Raw mix)

UK CD and cassette single, Australasian CD single
 "You Don't Know Me" (radio edit) – 3:59
 "You Don't Know Me" – 8:10
 "Rock da Spot" featuring Mr. Len – 5:50

UK 12-inch single and European CD single
 "You Don't Know Me" – 8:10
 "Rock da Spot" featuring Mr. Len – 5:50

Charts

Weekly charts

Year-end charts

Certifications

References

1998 songs
1999 singles
Armand Van Helden songs
Songs written by Armand Van Helden
Songs written by Duane Harden
FFRR Records singles
UK Singles Chart number-one singles